Yantarny Sports Palace, also known as Amber Sports Palace (Dvorets Sporta Yantarny) is a multi-purpose indoor arena that is located in Kaliningrad, Russia. It is a part of the Yantarny Sports Complex, which contains 10 sports halls, and 2 indoor arenas. The two indoor arenas consist of the Yantarny Sports Complex Small Arena, which has a seating capacity of 1,000 people, and Amber Arena, which has a seating capacity of 7,000 people. Amber Arena can be used to host numerous different events, such as: exhibitions, concerts, gymnastics, volleyball, martial arts tournaments, futsal, handball, and basketball.

History
Amber Arena opened in 2009. The Lokomotiv Kaliningrad Region Women's Volleyball Club has used the facility as its home arena. The arena has also been used as a home venue by both the senior Russian men's national volleyball team and the senior Russian women's national volleyball team, and it also hosted several major FIVB international volleyball tournaments. During the 2019–20 season, the arena was used as a substituent home arena of the VTB United League club CSKA Moscow, for two EuroLeague games.

References

External links
Official website 
Amber Arena Virtual 3D Tour 
Image 1 of Amber Arena Exterior
Image 2 of Amber Arena Exterior
Image 3 of Amber Arena Exterior
Image 1 of Amber Arena Interior

2009 establishments in Russia
Basketball venues in Russia
Handball venues in Russia
Indoor arenas in Russia
Music venues in Russia
Russia
Sports venues completed in 2009
Volleyball venues in Russia